The 2019 Rugby Europe Sevens Grand Prix Series was the eighteenth edition of the continental championship for rugby sevens in Europe. The series took place over two legs, the first at Moscow in Russia and the second at Łódź in Poland.

 won in Moscow but  won the Łódź tournament to take out the series championship title for the first time.

The Moscow leg of the tournament also served as a pre-qualifier for the 2020 Summer Olympics. The nine highest-placed eligible European teams from that tournament advanced to the Olympic regional qualifier held in Colomiers, France.

Schedule
The official schedule for the 2019 Rugby Europe Sevens Grand Prix Series was:

Series standings
Final standings over the two legs of the Grand Prix series:

{| class="wikitable" style="font-size:92%; margin-top:25px;"
|-
!colspan=2| Legend
|- 
| bgcolor=#bbf3ff| Blue fill
| align=left| Entry to Olympic regional qualifier and World Challenger Series
|-
| No fill
|align=left| Entry to Olympic regional qualifier
|-
|style="border-left:3px solid #06f;"|Dark bar
|Already a core team for the 2019–20 World Rugby Sevens Series
|-
| bgcolor=#ffeeee| Pink fill
|align=left| Excluded from Olympic regional qualifier
|-
| bgcolor=#ffcccc| Red fill
|align=left| Excluded from Olympic regional qualifier and relegated to 2020 European Trophy 
|}

Notes:
 As per Rugby Europe rules, France was placed higher than Ireland due to a better head-to-head record and superior points difference for the series. Italy was placed higher than Wales due to a superior points difference for the series.

 By agreement between the three unions on the island of Great Britain (England, Scotland, Wales), England, as highest finisher among those nations in the 2017–18 World Rugby Sevens Series, represented Great Britain in qualifying for the 2020 Olympic Sevens. The final make-up of the Great Britain men's team was determined by the British Olympic Association.

Moscow

All times in Moscow Time (UTC+03:00)

Pool stage

Pool A

Pool B

Pool C

Knockout stage

9th Place

5th Place

Cup

Łódź

All times in Central European Summer Time (UTC+02:00)

Pool stage

Pool A

Pool B

Pool C

Knockout stage

9th Place

5th Place

Cup

External links

 Tournament page

References

2019
2019 rugby sevens competitions
2019 in European sport
2019 in Russian rugby union
2019 in Polish sport
June 2019 sports events in Europe
July 2019 sports events in Europe